Bitargaon is a village in the Karmala taluka of Solapur district in Maharashtra state, India.

Demographics
Covering  and comprising 188 households at the time of the 2011 census of India, Bitargaon had a population of 814. There were 420 males and 394 females, with 111 people being aged six or younger.

References

Villages in Karmala taluka